Mount Carmel Cemetery is a Jewish cemetery located within the Cemetery Belt in Queens, New York City that opened in 1906.

The main section is in Glendale, Queens, and has more than 85,000 occupied plots. A new section was opened in nearby Ridgewood.

History
The Rural Cemetery Act, a New York City ban on new Manhattan cemeteries effective 1850, led to the opening of new ones in Brooklyn and Queens areas that form an area collectively called Cemetery Belt.

Over a dozen major Jewish cemeteries opened. Some of these have web sites that allow searching for buried friends and relatives.

Famous burials

References

External links
 
 
 A blogger's sampling of Famous Lower East Siders buried in Mount Carmel Cemetery
 Some info re other Cemetery Belt cemeteries

1906 establishments in New York City
Cemeteries in Queens, New York
Jewish cemeteries in New York City
Cemeteries established in the 1900s